Taylor Reed Marshall (born March 29, 1978) is an American Catholic YouTube commentator, former Episcopal Church priest, and former academic, now known for his advocacy of traditionalist Catholicism. He is the author of multiple books, including the 2019 bestselling book Infiltration: The Plot to Destroy the Church from Within.

Education and priesthood 
Marshall graduated from Texas A&M University in 2000 with a Bachelor of Arts degree in philosophy. After studying at Westminster Theological Seminary and Nashotah House, Marshall was ordained a priest of the Episcopal Church in 2006 by Jack Iker, the Bishop of Fort Worth who later established the Anglican Church of North America's Episcopal Diocese of Fort Worth. Marshall had previously served as a youth minister at Saint Andrew's Episcopal Church while an Episcopal deacon.

Shortly thereafter, in 2006, he and his wife converted to Catholicism. In 2009 Marshall earned his Master of Arts degree in philosophy, and in 2011 earned a Doctor of Philosophy degree in philosophy, at the University of Dallas.

Post-conversion career 
From January 2012 until June 2013, Marshall served as the chancellor of the now-defunct College of Saints John Fisher & Thomas More. Prior to his administrative work at the college, he was a professor of philosophy. Marshall also formerly served as the assistant director of the Archdiocese of Washington's Catholic Information Center. He is a founder of the New Saint Thomas Institute, an online Catholic theology educational program, and the Troops of Saint George, a Catholic scouting organization.

Marshall has published books in the fields of theology, philosophy, and historical fiction. All but one have been self-published by Saint John Press and Media, a company held and managed by Marshall. His 2019 book, Infiltration, claims to demonstrate that, over the last two centuries, the hierarchy of the Catholic Church has been actively subverted to promote Freemasonic power. The foreword of the book was written by Bishop Athanasius Schneider. The book has been controversial in Catholic circles, drawing both positive and negative reviews from various media outlets. Marshall, on his YouTube channel, regularly comments on statements from Viganò.

In October 2019, Marshall received media attention for publicizing an incident at the Catholic Church's Amazon Synod in which Alexander Tschugguel and an accomplice filmed themselves removing indigenous fertility statues, reportedly of Pachamama, from the Church of Santa Maria in Traspontina in Rome and throwing them into the Tiber river. In March 2020, it was revealed that Marshall himself had personally funded Tschugguel's trip to Rome and uploaded the video of the theft.

Marshall briefly received attention from Donald Trump's 2020 presidential campaign for popularizing Archbishop Viganò's letter warning of a deep state working to undermine the United States of America. Marshall was noticed by the campaign in return, and retweeted on the president's Twitter account. Traditionalist Catholic writer Matthew Walther criticized both Marshall's advocacy for then-President Trump and his claims against Pope Francis. Walther accused Marshall of "distorting or simply lying" about the pope in order to anger Catholics.

Personal life 
Marshall met his wife, Joy McPherson, in 1999. They were married on June 9, 2001, at Saint Andrew's Episcopal Church in Fort Worth, Texas. They have eight children. Marshall and his family converted from Anglicanism to Catholicism. They received confirmation from Bishop Kevin Vann in May 2006.

Books 
With the exception of Infiltration, Marshall's books are self-published under the imprint of Saint John Press and Media, a company held and managed by Marshall.
 The Origins of Catholicism trilogy
 The Crucified Rabbi: Judaism and the Origins of Catholic Christianity (Saint John Press, 2009)
 The Catholic Perspective on Paul: Paul and the Origins of Catholic Christianity (Saint John Press, 2010)
 The Eternal City: Rome & the Origins of Catholic Christianity (Saint John Press, 2012)
 Thomas Aquinas in 50 Pages: A Layman's Quick Guide to Thomism (Saint John Press, 2014)
 The Sword and Serpent trilogy
 Sword and Serpent (Saint John Press, 2014)
 The Tenth Region of the Night (Saint John Press, 2016)
 Storm of Fire and Blood (Saint John Press, 2017)
 Saint Augustine in 50 Pages: The Layman's Quick Guide to Augustinianism (Saint John Press, 2015)
 Infiltration: The Plot to Destroy the Church from Within (Sophia Institute Press, 2019)
 The Rosary in 50 Pages: The Layman's Quick Guide to Mary's Psalter (Saint John Press, 2020)
 Antichrist and Apocalypse: The 21 Prophecies of Revelation Unveiled and Described (Saint John Press, 2022)

References

External links

 

1978 births
Living people
21st-century American male writers
21st-century American non-fiction writers
21st-century Roman Catholics
American academic administrators
American male non-fiction writers
American philosophy academics
American podcasters
American traditionalist Catholics
American Roman Catholic religious writers
American YouTubers
Anglican priest converts to Roman Catholicism
Christian apologists
Philosophers from Texas
Texas A&M University alumni
Thomists
Traditionalist Catholic writers
University of Dallas alumni
Westminster Theological Seminary alumni